Xenon dibromide is an unstable chemical compound with the chemical formula XeBr2. It was only produced by the decomposition of iodine-129:
129IBr2– → XeBr2 + e–
Attempts to prepare this compound by combining elemental xenon and bromine only resulted in the XeBr radical. This compound is expected to be less stable than xenon difluoride and xenon dichloride. It is also expected to decompose to xenon and bromine.

References

Xenon(II) compounds
Bromides